Zumba Kids is the fifth video game based on the Zumba program. Although Zumba Fitness: World Party (2013) is the game before this, Zumba Kids is not a part of the Fitness series, which is only from Zumba Fitness to Zumba Fitness: World Party. It was developed by Zoë Mode and published by Majesco Entertainment. It was released on 19 November 2013. It is aimed at children.

Gameplay
Players can learn different dance styles as well as new routines including the Brazilian Funk, Polynesian, Celtic 
Bluegrass, Jive, Axe, Jazz, African and Disco. A new mode, Family Jam, will feature celebrity instructors Gina Grant as well as her daughters.

References

2013 video games
Dance video games
Fitness games
Kinect games
Majesco Entertainment games
Music video games
Unreal Engine games
Wii games
Xbox 360 games
Video games developed in the United Kingdom
Multiplayer and single-player video games
Zoë Mode games